This page summarizes Estonian football in 2021. It contains information about the league system, national teams, beach football and futsal.

National teams

Men

Senior

Youth

Women

Senior

Youth

Futsal
No arranged fixtures.

Beach
No arranged fixtures.

League system

Men

 a – team cannot get promoted.
  – spent 2020 season in a higher division.
  – spent 2020 season in a lower division.
  – spent 2020 season in the same division, but in a different group.
  – spent 2020 season in the same division.
  – did not compete in the league system in 2020.
  – finished first in 2020 Meistriliiga.

Meistriliiga

The 2021 season, which is scheduled to begin on 5 March and end on 6 November, contains only one newcomer: Pärnu Vaprus, who have previously completed five seasons in the division, finished the 2020 Esiliiga season as champions and were therefore promoted, while Tallinna Kalev got relegated after placing tenth in the league.

</onlyinclude>

Relegation play-off:

|}

Esiliiga

The 2021 season had three team changes in comparison to the previous year. Pärnu Vaprus got promoted and was therefore replaced by the relegated Tallinna Kalev, who ended their three-year run in the top division. The last two teams - Vändra Vaprus and Kohtla-Järve Järve - were relegated to Esiliiga B and their spot was taken by third divisions top teams: Paide Linnameeskond U21 will be debuting in Esiliiga, while Tartu Welco returns after a year in the lower division. Before the season had started, multiple former Meistriliiga or the Estonian national team players joined a team in Esiliiga: Dmitri Kruglov and Roman Sobtšenko signed contracts with Maardu Linnameeskond, Ats Purje returned from abroad to reach an agreement with Tallinna Kalev and Taavi Rähn along with Toomas Tohver joined Pärnu JK's staff. On 7 April it was decided that the table will be split into two halves after the 27th round - six teams will fight for promotion and four will try to escape from relegation.

The league started with Maardu Linnameeskond and Tallinna Kalev dominating the first half of the season. Both teams had only lost one match after the first 16 rounds. At the other end of the table, three teams from Tartu County had difficulties getting points: FC Elva got two wins from the twelve rounds, Tammeka U21 were winless in eleven consecutive games and Welco got their first win on 31 July.

The season was also plagued with a few controversies. Firstly, Elva were forced to sack their chief executive Marek Naaris after it was revealed that he had been in contact with underage women. Another problem occurred after 23 September, when Kalev beat Maardu Linnameeskond 4–2. It was reported that a few of Maardu's players had manipulated with the game's score and therefore the Estonian FA and Maardu Linnameeskond started an investigation to find out the potential sinners.

Relegation play-off:

|}

Esiliiga B

The 2021 Esiliiga B season contains five teams from the last season and five new teams. Vändra Vaprus and Ida-Virumaa Alliance got both relegated from the higher tier and will therefore return to Esiliiga B after respectively one and two seasons. They replace the promoted Tartu Welco and Paide Linnameeskond U21. Three teams got relegated after the last season: Rakvere Tarvas, Keila and Võru Helios will all play in II liiga after respectively ten, four and two years. They will be replaced by three debutants - Tallinna Legion U21, Tallinn and Harju Laagri.

After the first half of the season, two clubs - Viimsi and Harju Laagri - had separated themselves from others by going on long winstreaks: Viimsi lost their first game in the 9th round and newcomer Harju Laagri did not lose a single game between 23 May and 17 July. Their competitors were all extremely close and the battle between 3rd and 10th place was very tight. Before the 28th round, when the table was split into two, Tallinna Kalev U21 made a powerful recovery by winning five games in a row with a goal difference of 27:7 and was therefore handed a place in the top six.

Relegation play-off:
On 30 October, the Estonian FA decided that due to the new COVID-19 related restrictions, the play-offs between Esiliiga B and II liiga will be cancelled.

II liiga
The 2021 season will have teams from 12 different counties for the first time in the league's history. The season is scheduled to begin on 27 March and end on 24 October.

 Group A (North & East) 
In comparison to the previous season, only four teams got promoted or relegated: while Tallinn and Tallinna Legion U21 got promoted to Esiliiga B for the first time, Tartu Tammeka III and Jõgeva Wolves returned to the lower divisions after respectively three and two years in II liiga. These teams are replaced by Võru Helios, Rakvere Tarvas (both relegated from Esiliiga B), 2020 III liiga's champion Tartu Kalev and III liiga South's best team Elva II. In addition Kohtla-Järve Järve II changed its name to Ida-Virumaa Alliance.

 Group B (South & West) 
The II liiga S/W will consist of 14 teams of which eleven remain the same as last season. The only team that got promoted was second-placed Harju Laagri, who will be replaced by another Harju County club Keila. Whereas 2020 season's last and third to last team - Pärnu Poseidon and Põhja-Sakala - got relegated, the 13th placed Kose got readmitted for the second year in a row. The spots that those teams left vacant, were filled by III liiga West's top two. Hiiu County will have a team (Hiiumaa) in the fourth division for the first time since 2013 and Rummu Dünamo returns to the league after spending four years in III liiga.

Champion's match: 
On 30 October, the Estonian FA decided that due to the new COVID-19 related restrictions, the champion's match between II liiga N/E and II liiga S/W champions will be cancelled.

Relegation play-off: 
On 30 October, the Estonian FA decided that due to the new COVID-19 related restrictions, the play-offs between II liiga and III liiga will be cancelled.

III liiga
The fifth division's format remains the same as on previous years: each group's champion gets promoted to II liiga, second-placed clubs enter the promotion play-offs, 10th placed clubs enter the relegation play-offs and the bottom two will be relegated. The season starts on 11 April and ends on 10 October. For the first time in 15 years, there are no teams from any islands.

 Group A (North) 
2021 III liiga North consists of 12 teams, ten teams from Tallinn and two from Harju County. In comparison to the last season, there are only two changes: the two teams that finished last in 2020 (Tallinna Rumori Calcio and Tallinna Toompea) got relegated and therefore replace by two clubs, who debuted in the Estonian league system in 2020. While Tallinna Pocarr narrowly missed out on promotion in III liiga W, then Tallinna ReUnited became IV liiga's champion after winning every match in the A-tier. Before the start of the season reigning champion Lilleküla Retro dropped out of the league.

 Group B (South) 
The South group's line-up changed a lot in comparison to the previous year: in total six new teams joined the league. Three of them – Põhja-Sakala, Tartu Tammeka III and Jõgeva Wolves – got relegated from II liiga after respectively two, three and two seasons. One team (Viljandi Tulevik III) got promoted from IV liiga, one (Paide Linnameeskond IV) changes groups and one (Tartu Team Helm), who reached Rahvaliiga's (people's league) final, debutes in the Estonian league system. These clubs replace Elva II (promoted), Tartu Tammeka IV, Tarvastu & Tõrva ÜM, Tartu Helios II, Tartu TRT77 (all disbanded) and Äksi Wolves (relegated).

 Group C (East) 
Likewise to the previous season, III liiga East did not have twelve teams in the division. This happened due to 2020 IV liiga's bronze medalists Aruküla withdrawing from the league. Eight of the other teams remained the same, while Lasnamäe Ajax II was promoted from IV liiga in addition to Põhja-Tallinn and Tallinn II making their debuts in the league system.

 Group D (West) 
The III liiga's West group consisted of twelve teams of which only five competed the previous season. There were four newcomers (Nõmme United U21, Harju Laagri II, Tallinna Maksatransport, Raplamaa II), two promoted from IV liiga (Rummu Dünamo II, Läänemaa Harjumaa) and one relegated from II liiga (Pärnu Poseidon). They replace  Hiiumaa, Rummu Dünamo (promoted), Põhja-Tallinna Volta II (relegated), Tallinna Pocarr (transferred to III liiga North) and Keila II (ceased to exist).

Champion's match: 
On 30 October, the Estonian FA decided that due to the new COVID-19 related restrictions, the champion's match between III liiga champions will be cancelled.

Relegation play-off:
On 30 October, the Estonian FA decided that due to the new COVID-19 related restrictions, the play-offs between III liiga and IV liiga will be cancelled.

IV liiga

Women

Naiste Meistriliiga
The 2021 Women's higher division had only one team change in comparison to the previous year: the relegated Nõmme Kalju - who later decided against competing in the league system completely due to the scandal with their coach Getulio Aurelio - was replaced by Esiliiga champion Tallinna Ajax & Paide Linnanaiskond joint team, who at the start of the season changed their name to Lasnamäe FC Ajax. This season was also the first that had all teams play more than 20 games: the Estonian FA decided that each team will play each other three times and after that the table would be split into two, where each team will play another three games. In total all clubs have 24 matches.

Unlike the previous seasons, Tallinna Flora had a strong competitor - Saku Sporting -, who was neck and neck with them until the last round. The title was decided on 6 November, when FC Flora beat their rivals 2:1 and was crowned as champions for the fourth season in a row, meanwhile Saku finished second for the first time in their history. At the same time, the relegation battle was not as intense: newcomer Lasnamäe Ajax got their first point in the 14th round, when they drew with Tartu Tammeka. Also, their season ended prematurely, because on 9 October they forfeited the second match of the season and were therefore disqualified. The division's top scorer came from Tallinna Flora, where forward Lisette Tammik scored 25 goals.

Relegation play-off: 
On 30 October, the Estonian FA decided that due to the new COVID-19 related restrictions, the promotion/relegation play-offs will be cancelled.

Naiste Esiliiga
2021 Women's second division has three participant less than the previous season: Lasnamäe Ajax (got promoted), Tallinna Legion, Tartu Tammeka II, Kohtla-Järve Järve all lost their place in Esiliiga. While eight teams remain the same, Saku Sporting's reserve team makes its debut in the league system. Nõmme Kalju was also originally supposed to take part, but due to a sexual harassment accusation involving Kalju's head coach Getúlio Fredo, they decided to compete in Rahvaliiga.

Futsal
On 11 December, the FA decided that all indoor football leagues would be suspended due to the spread of COVID-19. The Coolbet Saaliliiga resumed on 8 January 2021, while the lower leagues resumed in February.

Coolbet Saaliliiga
The 2020–21 season began on 30 October 2020 with eight clubs. Seven teams remained the same as the previous year, the only change coming from Esiliiga's second-placed Rummu Dünamo getting promoted and replacing Sillamäe Alexela, who did not enter the league system. Therefore, Npm Sillamäe Silmet, who were last in 2019–20, were readmitted.

The league stage of the competition was dominated by reigning champion Viimsi Smsraha, who won all fourteen matches, thus becoming the first team to complete a perfect league season in Saaliliiga's history. Narva United spent most of the season in second place and finally reached play-off semifinals for the second time in successive years. Third place belonged to Tartu's Ravens Futsal Ares Security, who finished in the top three for the first time in their history. The team's start to the season was abysmal, picking up only two wins in their first eight matches, but getting 18 points from last six games raised them higher in the table. Newcomer Rummu Dünamo finished bottom with only two wins from fourteen games.

Play-off:

Relegation play-off:
Due to the COVID-19 pandemic Esiliiga could not be finished and therefore the Estonian FA decided that the following year's Coolbet Saaliliiga will be contested between ten teams: all eight clubs in 2021 Coolbet Saaliliiga remain (Rummu Dünamo will not get relegated) and in addition two of the best Esiliiga team's also join. Because the teams in the second division did not play the same amount of games, it was decided that a small tournament - to determine the promoted sides - will be held in May 2021. The clubs competing for promotion were: Sillamäe Kalev, Rõuge Saunamaa and Aruküla Radius. League leader Kadrina Vitamin Well was also given the opportunity, but they decided to decline.

</onlyinclude>

Saali Esiliiga
Esiliiga's teamlist remained almost the same as the previous year: the only changes being that Rummu Dünamo got promoted to Coolbet Saaliliiga and II liiga's top two Aruküla Radius and Rõuge Saunamaa got promoted to the league. Due to Sillamäe disbanding, Narva Ganza were readmitted to the second division. There were also a few name changes: Kadrina, Aruküla Unibox and Sillamäe Alexela II are now known as Kadrina Vitamin Well, Aruküla Radius and Sillamäe Kalev.

On 30 April 2021 - after Esiliiga had been stopped for almost two months - the Estonian FA decided to end the season. Due to the teams having played an uneven number of games, it was decided that the following year's top division will have ten clubs instead of eight. The two promoted sides would be determined in a mini tournament. While Sillamäe Kalev, Rõuge Saunamaa and Aruküla Radius took part in the tournament, Kadrina Vitamin Well declined from it.

Relegation play-off:

|}

Saali Teine liiga
The 2020–21 season's indoor football lowest league consisted of five clubs. Originally Narva Ganza, who was placed last in Esiliiga, was relegated into Teine liiga, but due to Sillamäe Dina not competing in the league system, they were readmitted to the second tier. Four of the five clubs remain the same, the only newcomer being Wolves III.

The season was cancelled on 9 February, because of the strict COVID-19 rules in Estonia, which allowed only Meistriliiga's and Esiliiga's teams play. Due to the teams not playing equal amount of games, the season did not have a champion.

Beach football

Coolbet Rannaliiga

Ranna Esiliiga

Cup competitions

Tipneri karikavõistlused 

Home teams listed on top of bracket. (AET): At Extra Time, (PL): Premium liiga, (EL): Esiliiga

Small Cup 

Home teams listed on top of bracket. (AET): At Extra Time. (PSO): Penalty Shoot-Out

Women's Cup 

 Nõmma Kalju  and Põhja-Tallinna Volta  withdrew from the competition.
Home teams listed on top of bracket. (AET): At Extra Time, (ML): Meistriliiga, (EL): Esiliiga, (RL): Rahvaliiga

Futsal's Cup 
On 26 February the Estonian FA decided that the Futsal's Cup would be cancelled due to the ongoing COVID-19 pandemic.

Supercups

County competition
On 25 June it was decided that the 2021 edition of the Estonian County Competition will be cancelled due to tight game schedule caused by the COVID-19 pandemic.

European competitions
Due to the fact that the Estonian FA lost five places in the association ranking for the 2020–21 season - Estonians fell from 46th place to 51st place - they were only given three spots instead of the usual four in European competitions. 2020 Meistriliiga's champion will start in the UEFA Champions League First qualifying round, while second placed team and the Estonian Cup winners will go to UEFA Europa Conference League First qualifying round.

Tallinna Flora

Paide Linnameeskond

Tallinna Levadia

Notable transfers

Inside Meistriliiga
Listed are only players, who have played at least one game for the Estonian national team.

1 Zakaria Beglarishvili has represented Georgia.

Outside Meistriliiga
Listed are all Estonian players, who have joined a foreign team.

Foreign players
Listed are all foreign players that have joined or left Meistriliiga. Players, whose background is red, changed their teams more than once.

 1 Ivan Lobay joined Ukrainian team Lviv on 10 January. 
 2 Sadio Tounkara joined Azerbaijani team Kesla on 11 January. 
 3 Nemanja Lakić-Pešić joined Serbian team Bačka on 14 January. 
 4 Manucho joined Saudi Arabian team Al-Kawkab on 26 January. 
 5 Marcelin Gando joined Cypriot team Enosis Neon Paralimni on 2 February. 
 6 Yuriy Kolomoyets joined Tajik team Istiklol on 2 February. 
 7 Semen Belyakov joined Russian team Krasny on 17 February. 
 8 Mikel Gurrutxaga joined Lithuanian team Sūduva on 3 March. 
 9 Ofosu Appiah joined Latvian team Noah Jurmala on 23 April. 
10 Marko Budic joined Croatian team Ponikve on 3 March. 
11 Odilavio joined Brazilian team Retrô Brasil on 24 May.

Retired players
Listed are all players, whose last club was a foreign team or a club that plays in Meistriliiga.

Managerial changes
Listed are all managers, who started coaching the national teams or in the top three divisions (Meistriliiga, Esiliiga, Esiliiga B).

See also
 2020 Meistriliiga
 2020-21 Estonian Cup
 List of Estonian football transfers winter 2020-21

References

 
Seasons in Estonian football